The table of years in poetry is a compact directory of all "years in poetry" pages—decades and centuries prior to 1500. 

Contents: 2000s - 1900s - 1800s - 1700s - 1600s - 1500s - 1400s - 1300s - Other

2000s in poetry

2000   2001   2002   2003   2004   2005   2006   2007   2008
2009   2010   2011   2012   2013   2014   2015   2016   2017   2018 2019 2020 2021 2022

1900s in poetry

1900   1901   1902   1903   1904   1905   1906   1907   1908   1909
1910   1911   1912   1913   1914   1915   1916   1917   1918   1919
1920   1921   1922   1923   1924   1925   1926   1927   1928   1929
1930   1931   1932   1933   1934   1935   1936   1937   1938   1939
1940   1941   1942   1943   1944   1945   1946   1947   1948   1949
1950   1951   1952   1953   1954   1955   1956   1957   1958   1959
1960   1961   1962   1963   1964   1965   1966   1967   1968   1969
1970   1971   1972   1973   1974   1975   1976   1977   1978   1979
1980   1981   1982   1983   1984   1985   1986   1987   1988   1989
1990   1991   1992   1993   1994   1995   1996   1997   1998   1999

1800s in poetry

1800   1801   1802   1803   1804   1805   1806   1807   1808   1809
1810   1811   1812   1813   1814   1815   1816   1817   1818   1819
1820   1821   1822   1823   1824   1825   1826   1827   1828   1829
1830   1831   1832   1833   1834   1835   1836   1837   1838   1839
1840   1841   1842   1843   1844   1845   1846   1847   1848   1849
1850   1851   1852   1853   1854   1855   1856   1857   1858   1859
1860   1861   1862   1863   1864   1865   1866   1867   1868   1869
1870   1871   1872   1873   1874   1875   1876   1877   1878   1879
1880   1881   1882   1883   1884   1885   1886   1887   1888   1889
1890   1891   1892   1893   1894   1895   1896   1897   1898   1899

1700s in poetry

1700   1701   1702   1703   1704   1705   1706   1707   1708   1709
1710   1711   1712   1713   1714   1715   1716   1717   1718   1719
1720   1721   1722   1723   1724   1725   1726   1727   1728   1729
1730   1731   1732   1733   1734   1735   1736   1737   1738   1739
1740   1741   1742   1743   1744   1745   1746   1747   1748   1749
1750   1751   1752   1753   1754   1755   1756   1757   1758   1759
1760   1761   1762   1763   1764   1765   1766   1767   1768   1769
1770   1771   1772   1773   1774   1775   1776   1777   1778   1779
1780   1781   1782   1783   1784   1785   1786   1787   1788   1789
1790   1791   1792   1793   1794   1795   1796   1797   1798   1799

1600s in poetry

1600   1601   1602   1603   1604   1605   1606   1607   1608   1609
1610   1611   1612   1613   1614   1615   1616   1617   1618   1619
1620   1621   1622   1623   1624   1625   1626   1627   1628   1629
1630   1631   1632   1633   1634   1635   1636   1637   1638   1639
1640   1641   1642   1643   1644   1645   1646   1647   1648   1649
1650   1651   1652   1653   1654   1655   1656   1657   1658   1659
1660   1661   1662   1663   1664   1665   1666   1667   1668   1669
1670   1671   1672   1673   1674   1675   1676   1677   1678   1679
1680   1681   1682   1683   1684   1685   1686   1687   1688   1689
1690   1691   1692   1693   1694   1695   1696   1697   1698   1699

1500s in poetry

1500   1501   1502   1503   1504   1505   1506   1507   1508   1509
1510   1511   1512   1513   1514   1515   1516   1517   1518   1519
1520   1521   1522   1523   1524   1525   1526   1527   1528   1529
1530   1531   1532   1533   1534   1535   1536   1537   1538   1539
1540   1541   1542   1543   1544   1545   1546   1547   1548   1549
1550   1551   1552   1553   1554   1555   1556   1557   1558   1559
1560   1561   1562   1563   1564   1565   1566   1567   1568   1569
1570   1571   1572   1573   1574   1575   1576   1577   1578   1579
1580   1581   1582   1583   1584   1585   1586   1587   1588   1589
1590   1591   1592   1593   1594   1595   1596   1597   1598   1599

1400s in poetry

1400s - 1410s - 1420s - 1430s - 1440s - 1450s - 1460s - 1470s - 1480s - 1490s

1300s in poetry

1300s - 1310s - 1320s - 1330s - 1340s - 1350s - 1360s - 1370s - 1380s - 1390s

Other years in poetry

13th century in poetry
12th century in poetry
11th century in poetry
10th century in poetry
9th century in poetry
8th century in poetry
7th century in poetry
6th century in poetry
5th century in poetry
4th century in poetry
3rd century in poetry
2nd century in poetry
1st century in poetry  
1st century BC in poetry
2nd century BC in poetry
3rd century BC in poetry
4th century BC in poetry
5th century BC in poetry
6th century BC in poetry
7th century BC in poetry

See also
 List of years in poetry
 Table of years in literature

Notes

 

Tables of years

eo:Jaroj en muziko